Antonio Cayetano March (born 3 July 2000), often referred to simply as Cayetano March, is an Ecuadorian tennis player.

March has a career high ATP singles ranking of 655 achieved on 14 September 2020. He also has a career high ATP doubles ranking of 510 achieved on 25 April 2022.

March has 1 ITF singles title.

March represents Ecuador at the Davis Cup, where he has a W/L record of 1–0.

World Tour and Challenger finals

Singles 1 (1–0)

Doubles 3 (0–3)

References

External links

2000 births
Living people
Ecuadorian male tennis players